Shohanur Rahman Sobuj (born 2 October 2000) known by his stage-name Shohanur Sobuj  is an international field hockey player in Bangladesh. He is a player of Bangladesh national field hockey team.

References

External link 

Bangladeshi male field hockey players
Field hockey players at the 2018 Asian Games
2000 births
Living people
Field hockey players at the 2018 Summer Youth Olympics